Morgan Lloyd (1822 - 5 September 1893) was a Welsh Liberal politician who sat in the House of Commons from 1874 to 1885.

Biography 
Lloyd was the son of Morris Lloyd of Cefngellgwm, Trawsfynydd, Merionethshire. He was educated at the University of Edinburgh and was called to the bar at Middle Temple in 1847. He became a QC in February 1873 and became a bencher of his Inn in 1875. He was JP for Merioneth.

At the 1868 general election Lloyd stood unsuccessfully at Anglesey. In 1874 he was elected Member of Parliament for Beaumaris. He held the seat until 1885 when it was replaced under the Redistribution of Seats Act 1885.

He later stood as the Liberal Unionist candidate for Anglesey.

Lloyd died at the age of 71.

Lloyd married firstly Mary Fleeming, daughter of Admiral Elphinstone Fleeming in 1848. He married secondly in 1879 Priscilla Willy Lewes daughter of James Lewis of Cwnhyar, Cardiganshire.

References

External links
 

1822 births
1893 deaths
UK MPs 1880–1885
UK MPs 1874–1880
Alumni of the University of Edinburgh
Members of the Middle Temple
Liberal Party (UK) MPs for Welsh constituencies
19th-century King's Counsel
Liberal Unionist Party parliamentary candidates
People from Trawsfynydd
Members of the Parliament of the United Kingdom for Beaumaris